Söder, also called South, is a city district in Malmö Municipality, Sweden. It was established on 1 July 2013 after the merger of Fosie and Oxie. It has a population of 56,300.

References

City districts of Malmö